The Congregation of Mary Immaculate Queen (CMRI) is a sedevacantist Traditionalist Catholic religious congregation. The CMRI is dedicated to promoting the message of Our Lady of Fátima and the devotion of the practice of Total Consecration to the Virgin Mary as taught by Saint Louis Marie de Montfort.

The CMRI holds that the Chair of St. Peter has been unoccupied since the death of Pope Pius XII in 1958. The CMRI is not connected to the present Holy See or any territorial church diocese.

The congregation lists over 90 traditional Catholic churches and chapels both in the U.S. and abroad, as well as at least 13 schools staffed by religious.

Names 
The group had used and was designated by various names:

 Fatima Crusade
 Tridentine Latin Rite Church
 Oblates of Mary Immaculate
 Fatima Crusaders
 Congregation of Mary Immaculate Queen

Leadership and core membership

The following people are part of the core membership of the group:
 The Drahman family has been involved with the CMRI since the early 1970s. Tom Drahman was instrumental in the purchase of Mt. St. Michael in 1977 and his son Fr. Gregory Drahman is a CMRI priest.
 The Urban family was part of the core leadership with Francis Schuckardt and Denis Chicoine. The Urban family was involved with Schuckardt prior to the move to Coeur d'Alene in the summer of 1967. Alvina ran a house for the boarding school. Notable figures in the family include Alvina Urban who was listed on legal paperwork along with Frater R. Denis Chicoine and "Christ the King Priory, Inc., an Idaho Corporation."

Superiors Generals 
Francis Schuckardt (1967–1984)
Denis Chicoine (1984–1989)
Mark Pivarunas (1989–1991)
Casimir M. Puskorius (1991–1995)
Mark Pivarunas (1995–present)

Activities
The Sisters at Mt. St. Michael record CDs and perform an annual Christmas concert.

The CMRI hold the Fatima conference at Mt. St. Michael in Spokane, Washington in October each year. The conference includes five days of lectures, daily Mass, devotions, and meals.

The CMRI has been involved with mass media since their founding as a method of recruitment and information. Throughout their history, the CMRI has produced books, pamphlets, and audio recordings. The CMRI runs a bookstore (Mary Immaculate Queen Center) and produces various periodicals: The Reign of Mary (quarterly magazine), Adsum (Mater Dei seminary monthly newsletter), and Anima Mariae, the CMRI sisters' newsletter. The CMRI also produces annual CDs of the Fatima Conference talks, as well as providing a livestream of Daily Mass and devotions from the City of Mary in Rathdrum, Idaho.

History

Speaking tours & Coeur d'Alene beginnings (1967 to 1971)

Francis Konrad Maria Schuckardt (a Catholic layman from Seattle, Wash.) and Robert Denis Chicoine (a former Marine, bricklayer, and newspaper pressman from New Bedford, Mass.) attracted their initial followers through international speaking tours as part of The Blue Army of Our Lady of Fatima. Chicoine first heard Schuckardt in a 1965 talk in San Diego about the message of Fatima. After listening to Schuckardt for three nights in a row, he became his disciple.

Beginning in the late 1960s, Schuckardt was able to attract numerous vagabond priests.

Schuckardt was ordained a priest and consecrated a bishop by Daniel Q. Brown from 28 October to 1 November 1971 at a motel in Chicago in front of 40 witnesses. Brown had been consecrated a bishop in 1969 by Hubert A. Rogers, a bishop of the North American Old Roman Catholic Church, but had left it and become independent in 1971.

The same year, Schuckardt changed the name of the group to Traditional Latin Rite Catholic Church.

Properties 
The CMRI owned and operated numerous schools, camps, and properties.

 A convent and girls high school in Colbert, Washington about 15 miles north of Spokane.
 A mansion located at 2314 E South Altamont Blvd in Spokane, Wash. that operated as the priory and Schuckardt's main residence

Chicoine era (1984 to 1989)

On June 3, 1984, Schuckardt and a small group of his followers were expelled from the CMRI and left the Spokane area, taking the name Tridentine Latin Rite Church (TLRC). In addition to Fr. Alphonsus, Schuckardt was followed by 4 religious sisters and 10 religious clerics and brothers. A larger group of the priests, religious, and laity remained with Chicoine at Mt. St. Michael, retaining the CMRI name and the bulk of the church property. Chicoine accused Schuckadrt of abuse & drug addiction. Local media in 1984 reported that there were 5000 followers of the group in the United States, 800 of whom live in the Spokane area. In 1986, local media reported that about half the members of the church's religious orders left.

Following the expulsion of Schuckardt, sedevacantist Bishop George Musey (of the Thuc apostolic line) conditionally re-administered the sacraments imparted by Schuckardt, whose validity was now considered dubious, and conditionally re-ordained the remaining priests.

In 1986, the Congregation held its first General Chapter, which established its rule and constitutions, that were later approved by sedevacantist Bishop Robert McKenna .

Pivarunas era (1989 to present) 
In August 1989, Father Tarcisius Pivarunas (Mark Pivarunas) was elected as the Superior General of the congregation.

On 1 February 1991, sedevacantist Bishop Moisés Carmona expressed his desire to consecrate as bishop whomever the congregation chooses. On 3 April 1991, Mark Pivarunas was elected to be consecrated a bishop. In accordance with Catholic practice, Mark Pivarunas discontinued the use of his religious name, "Tarcisius", and in accordance with the CMRI Constitutions, resigned his post as the Superior General. He was succeeded by Father Casimir M. Puskorius. On 24 September 1991, in Mount Saint Michael, Mark Pivarunas was consecrated a bishop by Bishop Carmona.

In June 2007, 15 sisters (including Rev. Mother Ludmilla) living at Mount Saint Michael in Spokane were expelled from the congregation because they had come to disagree with the congregation's stance of sedevacantism. They later reconciled with the Catholic Church and formed the Sisters of Mary, Mother of the Church (SMMC) under the authority of William Skylstad, bishop of Spokane.

Criticisms 
There has been a criticism from among former members, the media, and others toward the Schuckardt group, CMRI.
 In 1986, Jim Sparks of the Spokesman-Review Spokane Chronicle wrote a front page article "Tranquility returns to Tridentines" describing abuse, lawsuits, and practices of the group in the previous years, and changes since the departure of Schuckardt in 1984.

The Southern Poverty Law Center in 2006 designated Mount St. Michael one of twelve "anti-semitic radical traditionalist Catholic groups." The SPLC 2021 list of "Radical Traditional Catholicism" no longer includes Mt. St. Michael.

Lawsuits 
CMRI has been involved in lawsuits beginning in the 1970s across various states. These lawsuits occurred both before & after the Schuckardt split. Notable cases include:
 In 1981, The Nebraska Supreme Court gave Dennis Burnham custody of his daughter because of his wife's involvement with the church, not based on religious affiliation per se but due to concerns about the daughter's welfare.
 In 1986, O'Neil v. Schuckardt, 112 Ida. 472, 733 P.2d 693, 67 ALR4th 1065 (1986). A July 3 decision by the Idaho Supreme Court said a Montana man was not entitled to $750,000 from the church. Jerry O'Neil had sought the money on the grounds that the church alienated him from his wife.
 In 1987, the Supreme Court of Idaho heard a case involving a lawsuit of Jerry Bryant O'Neil against the Fatima Crusade Church itself for alienation of his wife's affections and for invasion of his wife's privacy.

Physical & religious abuse 
 Fr. Chicoine shaved (or cropped) the front part of a girl's hair for explaining to a friend the meaning of a menstrual period and the meaning of a common obscene gesture.
 A teaching nun gave a child a black eye and swollen face when the child refused to eat their own vomit.
 A 16-year-old was punished by being ordered to crawl across a parking lot and up a flight of stairs to a chapel on his bare knees, leading to damaged cartilage.

Sexual abuse 
Since Schuckardt's departure, information has been released that has shown the CMRI or TLRC were connected to people later accused of sexual abuse. The CMRI does not publish lists of former CMRI-affiliated priests who have been credibly accused of sexual abuse. The following accusations of sexual abuse have been made public:

 A priest was accused in December 2018 of ritual sexual abuse of a child at the Holy Innocents Catholic School in Waite Park, MN in the 1970s and 1980s. The Diocese of St. Cloud stated that this school was not affiliated with the diocese, and was operated independently by Robert and Bernice Sis.

Notes

References

Further reading
 Cubbage, Bob. Tridentine Latin Rite Church (Spokane, WA: Inland Register, 1980)
 
 Lebar, James J. Cults, Sect, and the New Age. Our Sunday Visitor, 1989.
 Waller, Gary. Walsingham and the English Imagination. 2011, p. 42.

External links

 Official website

Christian organizations established in 1967
Sedevacantism